Daughter of Albion Illegal is a 1914 Russian film directed by Boris Glagolin, based on a story written by Anton Chekhov. This was the second film adaptation of Chekhov's work. The film was released ten years after his death, a time when Chekhov thought no one would be reading his work anymore. It is unknown if a copy of the film exists.

Cast 

 Kondrat Yakovlev

External links
Daughter of Albion Illegal ad IMDb

1914 films
Films based on works by Anton Chekhov
Russian black-and-white films
Russian silent films
Films of the Russian Empire